Stock company can refer to:

Joint-stock company, a business entity which is owned by shareholders
Stock company, a group of actors resident to a repertory theatre, often performing more than one play but on different evenings or days.